Ante Kulušić (born 6 June 1986) is a Croatian retired footballer who last played as a defender for Turkish club Ankaragücü.

Early life and career
He was born in Šibenik, but pulls roots from the village Miljevci near birth town Šibenik in Šibenik-Knin County.

Club career
He played until 2003 for youth team of DOŠK Drniš, local football team based in Drniš, Šibenik-Knin County. After, he played for birth town club HNK Šibenik from 2003 to 2005. He went in Zagora Unešić, one more local football club based in Šibenik-Knin County, from Unešić village. After Croatia, he went in Turkey at Hacettepe and after in Gençlerbirligi and Balikesirspor. In 2017, he come back in Croatia, where he signed with Croatian First Football League club HNK Rijeka, where he was very little. On 1 August, signed contract with Moldavian Sheriff Tiraspol. In February 2019 Ante sign for Ankaragücü in the Turkey Süper Lig.

International career
In 2008 he capped for Croatia U21 football team.

Honours
HNK Rijeka
Croatian First Football League: 2016–17
Croatian Football Cup: 2016–17

FC Sheriff Tiraspol
Moldovan Divizia Națională: 2017, 2018

References

External links

1986 births
Living people
Sportspeople from Šibenik
Association football central defenders
Croatian footballers
Croatia under-21 international footballers
HNK Šibenik players
NK Zagora Unešić players
Hacettepe S.K. footballers
Gençlerbirliği S.K. footballers
Balıkesirspor footballers
HNK Rijeka players
FC Sheriff Tiraspol players
MKE Ankaragücü footballers
Croatian Football League players
Süper Lig players
TFF First League players
Moldovan Super Liga players
Croatian expatriate footballers
Expatriate footballers in Turkey
Croatian expatriate sportspeople in Turkey
Expatriate footballers in Moldova
Croatian expatriate sportspeople in Moldova